Syzygium canicortex, commonly known as yellow satinash, is a tree of the family Myrtaceae native to Queensland.

References

Myrtales of Australia
Trees of Australia
Flora of Queensland
canicortex
Taxa named by Bernard Hyland